CBT most commonly refers to:
 Cognitive behavioral therapy, a psychotherapeutic approach
 Cock and ball torture, a sexual activity involving pain or constriction applied to the human penis or testicles

CBT or cbt may also refer to:

Computing
 .cbt, an extension for tarred comic book archive files
 Complete binary tree, a binary tree data structure where all levels are filled
 Computer-based testing, a method of administering tests electronically using a computer or an equivalent electronic device
 Computer-based training
 Core-based trees, a proposal for making IP Multicast scalable by constructing a tree of routers
 Closed beta test, a beta version released to a select group for testing

Medicine
 Core body temperature, the normal body temperature of an organism

Organizations
 Cabot Corp (NYSE:CBT)
 Campaign for Better Transport (disambiguation), several public transport advocacy groups
 cbt (publisher), a publisher of Children's literature based in Munich, Germany
 Center for Biochemical Technology, former name of the Institute of Genomics and Integrative Biology
 Children's Book Trust, since 1957, a book publishing company based in Delhi, India
 Cincinnati Bell Telephone, the dominant telephone company for around Cincinnati, Ohio, US
 Committee on Bible Translation, a body of scholars with responsibility for overseeing the text of the New International Version of the Bible
 Confederação Brasileira de Tênis (Brazilian Tennis Confederation), the governing body of tennis in Brazil
 Connecticut Bank and Trust Company, a regional banking institution that merged into Bank of New England

Other uses
 Cadet Basic Training, United States Military Academy
 CBT-FM, a CBC Radio One station in Grand Falls-Windsor, Newfoundland and Labrador, Canada
 Ceneri Base Tunnel, a railway tunnel under construction in Switzerland
 Certified Broadcast Technologist, a professional title regulated by the Society of Broadcast Engineers
 Cock and Ball Torture (band), a German grindcore band
 Commonwealth Bank Trophy, a former national netball competition in Australia 
 Competitive Balance Tax, a luxury tax imposed by Major League Baseball
 Compulsory Basic Training, a basic training course for motorcyclists in the UK
 Coulomb blockade thermometer, a kind of thermometer based on quantum electronics

See also
 Chicago Board of Trade (CBOT)